is a sub-kilometer sized asteroid, classified as potentially hazardous asteroid and near-Earth object of the Apollo group that is notable because it provided evidence for binary asteroids in the near-Earth population.

Discovery 

The asteroid was discovered on 29 February 2000, by the Lincoln Near-Earth Asteroid Research (LINEAR) program at Lincoln Laboratory's Experimental Test Site, near Socorro, New Mexico.

The binary nature of this asteroid was suggested from radar observations taken with the Goldstone radar antenna on September 22 and 23, 2000, based on an observing proposal by J.-L. Margot and observations by S. J. Ostro and colleagues. Confirming observations were obtained with the Arecibo telescope from September 30 to October 7, 2000.

Orbit 

 orbits the Sun at a distance of 0.9–1.9 AU once every 19 months (583 days). Its orbit has an eccentricity of 0.38 and an inclination of 9° with respect to the ecliptic. The body's observation arc begins with its official discovery observation, as no precoveries were taken, and no prior identifications were made.

Binary system 

The 800-meter-diameter primary and the 300-meter-diameter secondary orbit each other with a separation of 2.6 kilometers and a period of 1.76 days.

The primary is spheroidal and is spinning at a rate near the breakup point for strengthless bodies. These two features were observed in multiple binary systems, suggesting that near-Earth asteroid binaries form by a mechanism involving spin-up and mass shedding. Currently the most generally accepted spin-up mechanism is the YORP effect.

Physical characteristics 

The asteroid is characterized as both a carbonaceous C-type and metallic M-type asteroid.

The density of the primary was calculated using the orbital elements of the binary system, the primary-to-secondary mass ratio, and estimates of the primary size. The primary has a low density of 1.7 g/cm3, which may indicate a "rubble pile" structure containing rocks and voids.

Numbering and naming 

This minor planet was numbered by the Minor Planet Center on 20 May 2008. As of 2018, it has not been named.

See also 
 List of minor planets and comets visited by spacecraft

References

External links 
 Lightcurve plot of (185851) 2000 DP107, Palmer Divide Observatory, B. D. Warner (2008)
2000 DP107
Arecibo Planetary Science website
Binary Asteroids in the Near-Earth Object Population, Margot et al., Science, 2002 (subscription)
 Asteroids with Satellites, Robert Johnston, johnstonsarchive.net
 Asteroid Lightcurve Database (LCDB), query form (info )
 Dictionary of Minor Planet Names, Google books
 
 
 

185851
185851
185851
185851
185851
20000229